Sri Maharaja Rakai Watukura Dyah Balitung Sri Dharmodaya Mahasambu was the king of the Kingdom of Mataram. He reigned circa 899–911. His territories included Central Java, East Java, and Bali. 

In 907 he created the Mantyasih inscription (also known as Balitung's charter), containing the list of Mataram kings. He also mentioned in Kaladi inscription (c. 909 CE).

Rise to power 
Historians such as Boechari and Poerbatjaraka argued that Dyah Balitung became the king as a result of his marriage to the daughter of his predecessor. It was speculated that his predecessor and his father-in-law is Rakai Watuhumalang, who according to the stele of Mantyasih ruled before Balitung.

However, the reason Balitung inherited the kingdom may not be that of marrying the King's daughter, since he also had a son, Mpu Daksa, according to the stele of Telahap. An alternative explanation could be that after Rakai Kayuwangi's death, the kingdom was broken. This is confirmed with Maharaja Rakai Gurunwangi's stele of Munggu Antan and Rakai Limus Dyah Dewendra's stele of Poh Dulur.

It has been suggested that Dyah Balitung became a hero by defeating Rakai Gurunwangi and Rakai Limus, and thus uniting the divided kingdoms. As a result, the people elected Balitung as King in favour of his brother-in-law, Mpu Daksa.

Reign 
During his rule, the palace was moved to Poh Pitu area and named Yawapura. It has been suggested that this is because the former palace, Mamratipura, built by Rakai Pikatan, was badly damaged as a result of war between Rakai Kayuwangi and Rakai Gurunwangi.

The oldest stele under the name of Balitung is the stele of Telahap, dated 11 September 899. However, it is possible he ascended the throne before 899. The next stele is Watukura, dated 27 July 902. This is the oldest stele that mentions the existence of the position of Rakryan Kanuruhan (Prime Minister). Meanwhile, the position of Rakryan Mapatih in Balitung's era is equivalent that of a crown prince, held by Mpu Daksa.

The stele of Telang, dated 11 January 904, mentions the development of a complex named Paparahuan, led by Rakai Welar Mpu Sudarsana, located on the verge of the Bengawan Solo river. Balitung freed the villages in Paparahuan and its surroundings from tax, and forbid the local inhabitants to collect payment from people who crossed the river. The stele of Poh (17 July 905) states that the village of Poh was freed from tax in return for taking care of Sang Hyang Caitya and Silunglung, properties of the previous ruler Rakai Pikatan, the grandfather of Mpu Daksa and Balitung's consort.

The stele of Kubu-Kubu (17 October 905) describes the gift given to Rakryan Hujung Dyah Mangarak and Rakryan Matuha Dyah Majawuntan in form of a village, Kubu-Kubu, as they both conquered the Bantan area. Historians speculate that Bantan might be an alternative name to Bali. Bantan means "sacrifice", while Bali means "offering".

The stele of Mantyasih (11 April 907) describes the gift given to five junior  because they kept the peace during Balitung's wedding. Also mentioned in this stele is the previous ruler of the kingdom before Balitung. In 907, Balitung offered the village of Rukam to his grandmother, Rakryan Sanjiwana.

The end of an era 
The accession of Balitung as king may have caused the previous king's son, Mpu Daksa, to become jealous. During the rule of his brother-in-law, Mpu Daksa held the position of Rakai Hino as described in a stele dated 21 December 910 about the partition of the Taji Gunung area between him and Rakai Gurunwangi. According to the stele of Plaosan, Rakai Gurunwangi is rumoured to be the son of Rakai Pikatan.

Historians speculate that Rakai Gurunwangi allied himself with Mpu Daksa, his nephew, as they are the son and grandson of Rakai Pikatan.

The historian Boechari is certain that the rule of Balitung ended as a result of Mpu Daksa's rebellion. According to the stele of Taji Gunung (910), Daksa was still as Rakai Hino, while by the stele of Timbangan Wungkal (913), he had already ascended the throne as king.

References 

 Marwati Poesponegoro & Nugroho Notosusanto. 1990. Sejarah Nasional Indonesia Jilid II. Jakarta: Balai Pustaka
 Slamet Muljana. 2005. Menuju Puncak Kemegahan (terbitan ulang 1965). Yogyakarta: LKIS
 Slamet Muljana. 2006. Sriwijaya (terbitan ulang 1960). Yogyakarta: LKIS

See also

 Kingdom of Mataram
 History of Indonesia

Indonesian Hindu monarchs
History of Java
Mataram Kingdom
10th-century Indonesian people
9th-century Indonesian people